Polynema euchariforme is a species of fairyfly.

References

Mymaridae
Insects described in 1833